Dimitrios E. Maximos (6 July 1873 – 17 October 1955) was a Greek banker and politician.  He briefly served as Prime Minister of Greece after World War II.

Life 
Maximos was born on 6 July 1873 in Patras. He began his career in banking in 1891 and was employed at the National Bank of Greece. In 1920 Maximos became governor of the bank before resigning in 1922. Between 1933 and 1935, he became Foreign Minister of the government of Panagis Tsaldaris. He was Prime Minister of Greece in 1947. He died on 17 October 1955. His home in central Athens, the Maximos Mansion, serves since 1982 as the official seat of the Prime Minister of Greece.

References

1873 births
1955 deaths
20th-century prime ministers of Greece
Politicians from Patras
Foreign ministers of Greece
Prime Ministers of Greece